Arnold Andenmatten (22 August 1922 – 24 March 2018) was a Swiss skier and skiing instructor.

Biography 
Born in Saas-Fee, Andenmatten was the winner of the first classical glacier downhill skiing from the Allalinhorn down to Saas-Fee in 1946 (time: 8:07 min.). As a soldier he participated in the demonstration event, military patrol. He had the military rank of a Kanonier at this time. His Swiss team (R. Zurbriggen, H. Zurbriggen, Vouardoux, Andenmatten) finished first in the military patrol event. In 1947 he, Robert Zurbriggen, Karl Hischier and Karl Bricker also won the revenge race in Oslo. As of 2008 he still participated in ski races, for example as the eldest competitor of the Saas-Balen valley race on 17 February 2008.

References 

1922 births
2018 deaths
Swiss military patrol (sport) runners
Swiss male alpine skiers
Olympic biathletes of Switzerland
Military patrol competitors at the 1948 Winter Olympics
People from Visp (district)
20th-century Swiss people